Anthurium miniatum is a species of plant in the family Araceae. It is endemic to Ecuador.  Its natural habitat is subtropical or tropical moist montane forests. It is threatened by habitat loss.

References

Endemic flora of Ecuador
miniatum
Vulnerable plants
Taxonomy articles created by Polbot